The IUPAC Nomenclature for Transformations is a methodology for naming a chemical reaction. Traditionally a chemical reaction especially in organic chemistry is named after its inventor, the so-called name reaction, to name just a few: Knoevenagel condensation, Wittig reaction or Diels-Alder reaction. A lot of reactions derive their name from the reagent involved like bromination or acylation. On rare occasions, the reaction is named after the company responsible like in the Wacker process or the name only hints at the process involved like in the halogen dance rearrangement. The related IUPAC nomenclature is designed for naming organic compounds themselves.

The IUPAC Nomenclature for Transformations was developed in 1981 and presents a clear-cut methodology for naming an organic reaction. It incorporates the reactant and product in a chemical transformation together with one of three transformation types:
 substitutions have the infix -de- example: methoxy-de-bromination for the chemical reaction of a bromo-alkane to an alkoxy-alkane
 additions end with -addition example: hydro-bromo-addition for the hydrobromination of an alkene
 eliminations. end with -elimination example: dibromo-elimination.

Notes and references 

 
 

Chemical nomenclature
Chemical reactions